The Lotus Type 62 race car was a development of the successful Type 47 and intended to race in the Appendix J Group 6 Prototype Class. The car was designed by Martin Waide at Lotus Components and had a space frame chassis, and featured the new Lotus 2.0-litre LV240 (Type 904) DOHC engine (in time this engine would become the Type 907 engine, used to power the Lotus Elite, Esprit, Eclat and Excel). 

The car had limited competitive success, due mainly to problems with the Vauxhall derived engine block. The car's most successful race was finishing 3rd position at the Tourist Trophy at Oulton Park in 1969.

Legacy 
The Lotus Type 62 served as the inspiration for the Lotus-Radford Type 62-2, designed and built by Radford, a British coachbuilding firm.

References 

62